Hilf is a surname. Notable people with the surname include:

 Arno Hilf (1858–1909), German violin virtuoso
 Bill Hilf, American businessman
 Rudolf Hilf (1923–2011), German historian

See also
 
 Help (disambiguation)
 Hill (surname)

Hebrew-language surnames